The 100 percent corner is the busiest area in a city. Often it is a crossroads of several major streets, and the place with the highest land value and/or where grid plan numbering is based upon. The term is also used for the place for ideal real estate projects, sometimes considered the intersection of two highways in a suburban area. The terms "hundred percent location", "hundred percent corner", or "peak land value intersection" may also be used.

The 100 percent corner is used in research as part of a method to determine a city's downtown area, by measuring a radius (e.g. one mile) from the central intersection.

Examples
Broad and High Streets in Columbus, Ohio
Fayette Street and South Salina Street in Syracuse, New York
Fourth and Muhammad Ali Boulevard in Louisville, Kentucky
 Church and Chapel Streets in New Haven, Connecticut

See also
 City centre

References

Urban studies and planning terminology
Real estate terminology